The Watertower is a 1994 young adult's picture book written by Australian author Gary Crew and illustrated by Steven Woolman.  The story, which takes place in a small rural town called Preston, is about two teenagers exploring a sinister watertower on Shooter's Hill.  The illustrations for the watertower use a combination of chalk and pencil on black paper, and acrylic paint on textured board. The text is simple, while the complex illustrations create an eerie atmosphere, most notably with the recurring theme of the watertower symbol.

The book follows the codes and conventions of a subgenre of science fiction, known as gothic science fiction. It involves a "pleasing hobo sort of terror" related to gothic tradition but also has references to technology corrupting life. This is represented through the use of satellites.

Awards

 Won - CBCA Children's Book of the Year Award: Picture Book (1995)
 Won - Books I Love Best Yearly: Read Australia Award (1995)

References

External links
Plot summary and literary assessment, Lifetime Literacy

1994 children's books
Australian picture books
Science fiction picture books
Australian children's books
Novels by Gary Crew
BILBY Award-winning works